Be Cool is a 2005 American crime-comedy film based on Elmore Leonard's 1999 novel of the same name and the sequel to Leonard's 1990 novel Get Shorty (itself adapted into a 1995 film of the same name) about mobster Chili Palmer's entrance into the music industry. This was Robert Pastorelli's final film, as he died one year before its theatrical release.

The film adaptation of Be Cool began production in 2004. It was directed by F. Gary Gray, produced by Danny DeVito (who produced and co-starred in the first film), and starred John Travolta, reprising his role from the first film. It also marked the second collaboration between Travolta and Vince Vaughn after starring in 2001's Domestic Disturbance. The film was released on March 4, 2005. It received negative reviews and grossed $95 million against a budget of $53–75 million.

Plot
Chili Palmer, restless after years of filmmaking, enters the music industry after witnessing the Russian mob execute his friend Tommy Athens, owner of a record company. Chili offers to help Tommy's widow, Edie Athens, manage the failing business, which owes $300,000 to hip-hop producer Sin LaSalle.

Chili is impressed by singer Linda Moon and helps free her from contractual obligations to Nick Carr and Raji, who has a gay Samoan bodyguard named Elliot, an aspiring actor and the butt of Carr and Raji's homophobic jokes. Carr and Raji hire a hitman, Joe "Loop" Lupino to kill Chili before he can save Edie's company by arranging a live performance for Linda along with Steven Tyler and Aerosmith.

Lasalle demands payment of the $300,000, but agrees to give Chili a few days to get the money plus the vig. When the Russians attempt to kill Chili, Joe Loop mistakenly kills Ivan Argianiyev, the Russian mob's hitman. Carr is furious about the mistake and demands that Raji talks to Loop at once. Raji then kills Loop with a metal baseball bat after Loop "disrespects" him.

Carr then tries to trick Chili by handing him a pawn ticket, claiming that Linda's contract is being held at a pawn shop owned by the Russians. Chili being much smarter than Carr anticipated, has Edie give the ticket to the police, who pay the Russians a visit. Raji and Elliot set up LaSalle by making him believe that Carr tricked Chili in giving him the $300,000 to get Linda's contract. LaSalle and the DubMD confront Carr in his office, as do Bulkin and his men. Insulted by Bulkin's racist remarks, LaSalle kills him.

Chili squeezes in a dance scene with Edie, celebrating as Linda Moon gets to make her appearance with Aerosmith in concert. Based on Linda's success in that concert, Chili assuages LaSalle by making him her producer.

But Carr is not accepting any deal, so he makes Raji put Elliot to kill Chili. By assuring Elliot that he can help his acting career, Chili befriends him. After learning that Chili had gotten him an audition for a Nicole Kidman film, Elliot turns on Raji, who had erased the message on his answering machine. For all his smooth talking and flamboyant wardrobe, Raji finds himself in a firework conflagration which roasts him live on camera. Carr is arrested on murder charges when Chili makes sure he is caught with the bat used to kill Joe Loop, via another pawn ticket.

At the MTV Video Music Awards, Linda wins the awards for best new artist and video of the year. During her acceptance speech, she thanks Edie, Sin and Chili. Edie and Chili leave the award ceremony. And as Chili drives off, he passes a billboard revealing that Elliot is the co-star of a new movie with Nicole Kidman.

Cast

 Jessica Roesener as Concert Goer

Cameos

Soundtrack
The film's soundtrack was released on March 1, 2005.

Songs featured in the film but not included on the soundtrack are:

 "Act a Ass" E-40
 "Autumn Blue"
 "Best of My Love" Christina Milian, Carol Duboc, and Minae Noji
 "Beethoven's 9th" Dean Hurley
 "Brazilian Day" XMAN
 "Chattanooga Choo Choo" Steve Lucky & The Rhumba Bums
 "Cooliest" Jimi Englund
 "Cryin'" Aerosmith and Christina Milian
 "Deanstone" Dean Hurley
 "(Everytime I Hear) That Mellow Saxophone" Steve Lucky & The Rhumba Bums
 "Heistus Interruptus"
 "Kiss Me" Sixpence None the Richer
 "Knockin' On Heaven's Door" Bob Dylan
 "Lady Marmalade Carol Duboc and Minae Noji
 "La Primavera"
 "Melbourne Mansion"
 "Marvelous Things" Eisley (video visible in background)
 "Me So Horny" 2 Live Crew
 "Moving On"
 "Praia de Genipabu" Barbara Mendes
 "Rock It Like Diss" Jahmaal Rashad
 "Santa Monica Man" Dean Hurley
 "Short Pimp" Noah Lifschey and Dylan Berry
 "Strings in Velvet" Manfred Minnich
 "Travel Russia #2" The Dollhouse Players
 "Wild Out" Cheming (featuring XMAN)

Release

Box office
On a production budget of $53–75 million, Be Cool grossed $56 million in North America and $39.2 million internationally, totaling up to $95.2 million worldwide.

Critical reception
On Rotten Tomatoes, the film holds an approval rating of 30% based on 171 reviews, with an average rating of 4.6/10. The site's critical consensus reads: "Be Cool is tepid, square, and lukewarm; as a parody of the music business, it has two left feet." On Metacritic, the film has a weighted average score of 37 out of 100, based on 38 critics, indicating "generally unfavorable reviews." Audiences polled by CinemaScore gave the film an average grade of "B−" on an A+ to F scale.

Roger Ebert of the Chicago Sun-Times called it "A classic species of bore: a self-referential movie with no self to refer to. One character after another, one scene after another, one cute line of dialogue after another, refers to another movie, a similar character, a contrasting image, or whatever."
Halliwell called it "a palpable miss, a movie so lazy and laid back that it falls over; there are none of those insights ... that made Get Shorty so enjoyable".

In an August 2015 interview with Deadline, director F. Gary Gray discussed the failure of the film, stating: "With Be Cool, I made some assumptions in thinking that movie was going to work. I'd just made a successful PG-13 movie [The Italian Job], and when I walked into Be Cool, it was rated R and then at the last minute in preproduction I was told, 'Well, you have to make this PG-13.' I should have walked off the film. This was a movie about shylocks and gangsta rappers and if you can't make that world edgy, you probably shouldn't do it. I walked in thinking I was going to make one movie and then it changed. Maybe it was arrogant of me to think because I had success in this realm of PG-13 I could make that work".

References

External links
 
 
 
 

2005 films
2000s crime comedy films
2005 LGBT-related films
2000s satirical films
American crime comedy films
American LGBT-related films
American satirical films
American sequel films
2000s English-language films
Films about music and musicians
Films based on works by Elmore Leonard
Films directed by F. Gary Gray
Films scored by John Powell
Films set in Los Angeles
Films shot in Los Angeles
Films shot in Massachusetts
Metro-Goldwyn-Mayer films
2000s Russian-language films
Films produced by Danny DeVito
2005 comedy films
Films about the Russian Mafia
2000s American films